Nathan Charles Blasdell (born September 26, 1994) is an American guitarist, songwriter, composer, and businessperson. He is currently a guitarist for the experimental band, I Set My Friends on Fire, and currently runs a NASCAR management agency with Buffalo Bills running back, Antonio Williams, and the father of NASCAR driver, Joe Graf Jr. He was previously a guitarist for the post-hardcore experimental rock band The Bunny the Bear from 2012 to 2015.

Early career

Music career 
Blasdell was 20 years old when he joined the experimental rock band, The Bunny the Bear, as a touring guitarist, and were signed by Victory Records. 

Nate left The Bunny the Bear in 2015 to revive the experimental band, I Set My Friends on Fire, as the new songwriter, replacing Nabil Moo. In 2016, Blasdell and the band signed with the Warner Brothers Records company, and went on tour in the United States, Russia, Europe, United Kingdom, Asia, and Australia. At the beginning of 2017, they announced they would no longer be a label for the company.

Songwriter career 
Blasdell has written songs for artists, such as Big Time Rush, MKTO, and Demi Lovato. He was featured as a writer in the song "Somebody to You," which was an RIAA certified gold in the United States, and an ARIA certified platinum in Australia. Blasdell has also co-wrote songs "Air," and "You're In Or You're Out," with The All American Rejects lead vocalist Tyson Ritter, which would both later be featured on the NBC sitcom "Parenthood."

Other projects 
Blasdell has starting managing NASCAR drivers after befriending driver Landon Cassill, from the bands music. On April 6, 2021, he formed a NASCAR sports management agency with Antonio Williams, an NFL running back for the Buffalo Bills, and the father of NASCAR driver Joe Graf Jr. The agency currently represents drivers in all three of NASCAR's national series', with drivers including Joe Graf Jr., Chris Hacker, and Logan Misuraca. Chase Purdy would join the agency for the 2022 season.

Personal life 
Blasdell currently resides in Mooresville, North Carolina. He graduated from Brighton High School in his hometown, Rochester, New York, in 2012. He had attended the University of Michigan majoring in International Business, and is related to the former Disney CEO, Michael Eisner.

References 

Musicians from Rochester, New York
Guitarists from New York (state)
American male composers
Songwriters from New York (state)
American sports agents
1994 births
Living people
People from Mooresville, North Carolina
University of Michigan alumni
American male songwriters